The Year of the Dragon is a musical composition by Philip Sparke originally written for brass band in 1984, and later transcribed for wind band. There are many rhythms and chord progressions throughout the piece that would suggest a slight jazz influence, mostly in the style of George Gershwin.

Instrumentation 
E soprano cornet, 9 B cornets, B flugelhorn, 3 E horns, 2 B baritones, 2 B trombones, bass trombone, 2 B euphoniums, 2 E basses, 2 B basses, 3 percussion (snare drum, bass drum, timpani, xylophone, glockenspiel, cymbal, tambourine, triangle, tam-tam)

Structure 
It is in three movements: Toccata, Interlude, and Finale.

Toccata 
The first movement starts with a sudden drum roll solo, which is then followed by a low, ominous motif. This is repeated until the rest of the winds join in, introducing the first melodic theme in the piece. This is intermitted by a dance-like section. The rest of the band then re-enters the fray, leading into a brief chorale section before going back into the dance. This continues until the movement fades out with the final faint echoes of the opening melody.

Interlude 
This movement is largely a sorrowful, delicate trombone solo. A slightly more joyful chorale offers a brief exit from the melancholic setting, before the solo returns to bring the movement to a hushed close. This solo is often played in a rubato form, allowing the soloist to slow down or speed up for virtuosic effect.

Finale 
The final movement of this piece begins with a fast feature with occasional outbursts in the background. Following this is a march-like section with playful strains planted throughout. The main theme is then reiterated with more triumphal sounding excerpts played by the horns. The bells are given a fanfare to play as the winds crescendo to a final climax and ending the piece with a fast-paced, rousing conclusion..

References

External links 
 The Year of the Dragon (The Music of Philip Sparke)

1984 compositions
Compositions for brass band
Concert band pieces